Bessenbach is a community in the Aschaffenburg district in the Regierungsbezirk of Lower Franconia (Unterfranken) in Bavaria, Germany.

Geography

Location

Bessenbach lies southeast of the town of Aschaffenburg among the Spessart range's outlying hills.

Subdivision
Bessenbach's Ortsteile are Beetacker, Frauengrund, Gemeindezentrum, Keilberg, Klingerhof, Klingermühle, Oberbessenbach, Steiger, Straßbessenbach, Unterbessenbach, Waldmichelbach and Weiler.

History
The community was formed on 1 January 1972 through the merger of the communities of Keilberg and Straßbessenbach. In 1978, the community of Oberbessenbach followed.

Governance

Community council

The council is made up of 20 council members.

(as at municipal election held on 2 March 2008)

Mayor
On 15 March 2020, Christoph Ruppert (CSU) was elected mayor.

Coat of arms
The community's arms might be described thus: Azure a stork argent armed gules with two heads, the sinister reguardant, in base a fess wavy of the second.

The formerly self-administering communities of Keilberg, Straßbessenbach and Oberbessenbach merged into a greater community in 1978, taking on the historical name of Bessenbach once again.

The local noble family, also called Bessenbach, were instrumental in the community's development. Their ancestral seat, a castle, stood in today's centre of Keilberg. The family's existence is documented as far back as the 12th century. They had lordly and juridical rights throughout the Bessenbach valley that they alienated in the late 13th century. The family arms – the two-headed stork – were later adopted as the charge in the community's arms. Standing for the Bessenbach, the brook that serves as the geographical link in the community named after it, is the wavy fess in the base of the escutcheon.

These arms have been borne since 28 November 1977.

Town twinning
 Dury, Somme, France
 Saint-Fuscien, Somme, France
 Sains-en-Amiénois, Somme, France

This is one partnership that Bessenbach has maintained with all three French communes since 1985.

Infrastructure

Transport
The community is served by various bus lines of the Verkehrsgemeinschaft am Bayerischen Untermain ("Transport Association of the Bavarian Lower Main") from the main railway station in Aschaffenburg.

Moreover, Bessenbach lies right on the A 3 interchange Bessenbach/Waldaschaff and near the Spessart service centre near Rohrbrunn.

Sport
The Ortsteil of Straßbessenbach has been host to the German Sidecarcross Grand Prix numerous times.

References

External links

  

Aschaffenburg (district)